Nickel sulfide  is any inorganic compound with the formula NiSx.  They range in color from bronze (Ni3S2) to black (NiS2).  The nickel sulfide with simplest stoichiometry is NiS, also known as the mineral millerite.  From the economic perspective, Ni9S8, the mineral pentlandite, is the chief source of mined nickel.  Other minerals include heazlewoodite (Ni3S2) and polydymite (Ni3S4). The mineral Vaesite is NiS2. Some nickel sulfides are used commercially as catalysts.

Structure
Like many related materials, nickel sulfide adopts the nickel arsenide motif.  In this structure, nickel is octahedral and the sulfide centers are in trigonal prismatic sites.

NiS has two polymorphs. The α-phase has a hexagonal unit cell, while the β-phase has a rhombohedral cell. The α-phase is stable at temperatures above , and converts into the β-phase at lower temperatures. That phase transition causes an increase in volume by 2-4%.

Synthesis and reactions
The precipitation of solid black nickel sulfide is a mainstay of traditional qualitative inorganic analysis schemes, which begins with the separation of metals on the basis of the solubility of their sulfides.  Such reactions are written:

Ni2+  + H2S   →   NiS  +  2 H+ 

Many other more controlled methods have been developed, including solid state metathesis reactions (from NiCl2 and Na2S) and high temperature reactions of the elements.

The most commonly practiced reaction of nickel sulfides involves conversion to nickel oxides.  This conversion involves heating the sulfide ores in air:

Occurrence

Natural
The mineral millerite is also a nickel sulfide with the molecular formula NiS, although its structure differs from synthetic stoichiometric NiS due to the conditions under which it forms. It occurs naturally in low temperature hydrothermal systems, in cavities of carbonate rocks, and as a byproduct of other nickel minerals.

In glass manufacturing
Float glass contains a small amount of nickel sulfide, formed from the sulfur in the fining agent  and the nickel contained in metallic alloy contaminants.

Nickel sulfide inclusions are a problem for tempered glass applications. After the tempering process, nickel sulfide inclusions are in the metastable alpha phase. The inclusions eventually convert to the beta phase (stable at low temperature), increasing in volume and causing cracks in the glass. In the middle of tempered glass, the material is under tension, which causes the cracks to propagate and leads to spontaneous glass fracture. That spontaneous fracture occurs years or decades after glass manufacturing.

References

Nickel compounds
Sulfides
Nickel arsenide structure type